Desalination is a process that takes away mineral components from saline water. More generally, desalination refers to the removal of salts and minerals from a target substance, as in soil desalination, which is an issue for agriculture. Saltwater (especially sea water) is desalinated to produce water suitable for human consumption or irrigation. The by-product of the desalination process is brine. Desalination is used on many seagoing ships and submarines. Most of the modern interest in desalination is focused on cost-effective provision of fresh water for human use. Along with recycled wastewater, it is one of the few rainfall-independent water resources.

Due to its energy consumption, desalinating sea water is generally more costly than fresh water from surface water or groundwater, water recycling and water conservation. However, these alternatives are not always available and depletion of reserves is a critical problem worldwide. Desalination processes are using either thermal methods (in the case of distillation) or membrane-based methods (e.g. in the case of reverse osmosis) energy types.

An estimate in 2018 found that "18,426 desalination plants are in operation in over 150 countries. They produce 87 million cubic meters of clean water each day and supply over 300 million people." The energy intensity has improved: It is now about 3 kWh/m3 (in 2018), down by a factor of 10 from 20-30 kWh/m3 in 1970. Nevertheless, desalination represented about 25% of the energy consumed by the water sector in 2016.

Applications

There are now about 21,000 desalination plants in operation around the globe. The biggest ones are in the United Arab Emirates, Saudi Arabia, and Israel. The world's largest desalination plant is located in Saudi Arabia (Ras Al-Khair Power and Desalination Plant) with a capacity of 1,401,000 cubic meters per day.

Desalination is currently expensive compared to most alternative sources of water, and only a very small fraction of total human use is satisfied by desalination. It is usually only economically practical for high-valued uses (such as household and industrial uses) in arid areas. However, there is growth in desalination for agricultural use and highly populated areas such as Singapore or California. The most extensive use is in the Persian Gulf.

While noting costs are falling, and generally positive about the technology for affluent areas in proximity to oceans, a 2005 study argued, "Desalinated water may be a solution for some water-stress regions, but not for places that are poor, deep in the interior of a continent, or at high elevation. Unfortunately, that includes some of the places with the biggest water problems.", and, "Indeed, one needs to lift the water by 2000 m, or transport it over more than 1600 km to get transport costs equal to the desalination costs."

Thus, it may be more economical to transport fresh water from somewhere else than to desalinate it. In places far from the sea, like New Delhi, or in high places, like Mexico City, transport costs could match desalination costs. Desalinated water is also expensive in places that are both somewhat far from the sea and somewhat high, such as Riyadh and Harare. By contrast in other locations transport costs are much less, such as Beijing, Bangkok, Zaragoza, Phoenix, and, of course, coastal cities like Tripoli." After desalination at Jubail, Saudi Arabia, water is pumped 320  km inland to Riyadh. For coastal cities, desalination is increasingly viewed as a competitive choice.

In 2023, Israel was using desalination to replenish the Sea of Galilee's water supply.

Not everyone is convinced that desalination is or will be economically viable or environmentally sustainable for the foreseeable future. Debbie Cook wrote in 2011 that desalination plants can be energy intensive and costly. Therefore, water-stressed regions might do better to focus on conservation or other water supply solutions than invest in desalination plants.

Technologies

Desalination is an artificial process by which saline water (generally sea water) is converted to fresh water.  The most common desalination processes are distillation and reverse osmosis.

There are several methods. Each has advantages and disadvantages but all are useful. The methods can be divided into membrane-based (e.g., reverse osmosis) and thermal-based (e.g., multistage flash distillation) methods. The traditional process of desalination is distillation (i.e., boiling and re-condensation of seawater to leave salt and impurities behind).

There are currently two technologies with a large majority of the world's desalination capacity: multi-stage flash distillation and reverse osmosis.

Distillation

Solar distillation
Solar distillation mimics the natural water cycle, in which the sun heats sea water enough for evaporation to occur. After evaporation, the water vapor is condensed onto a cool surface. There are two types of solar desalination. The first type uses photovoltaic cells to convert solar energy to electrical energy to power desalination. The second type converts solar energy to heat, and is known as solar thermal powered desalination.

Natural evaporation
Water can evaporate through several other physical effects besides solar irradiation. These effects have been included in a multidisciplinary desalination methodology in the IBTS Greenhouse. The IBTS is an industrial desalination (power)plant on one side and a greenhouse operating with the natural water cycle (scaled down 1:10) on the other side. The various processes of evaporation and condensation are hosted in low-tech utilities, partly underground and the architectural shape of the building itself. This integrated biotectural system is most suitable for large scale desert greening as it has a km2 footprint for the water distillation and the same for landscape transformation in desert greening, respectively the regeneration of natural fresh water cycles.

Vacuum distillation
In vacuum distillation atmospheric pressure is reduced, thus lowering the temperature required to evaporate the water. Liquids boil when the vapor pressure equals the ambient pressure and vapor pressure increases with temperature. Effectively, liquids boil at a lower temperature, when the ambient atmospheric pressure is less than usual atmospheric pressure. Thus, because of the reduced pressure, low-temperature "waste" heat from electrical power generation or industrial processes can be employed.

Multi-stage flash distillation
Water is evaporated and separated from sea water through multi-stage flash distillation, which is a series of flash evaporations. Each subsequent flash process utilizes energy released from the condensation of the water vapor from the previous step.

Multiple-effect distillation
Multiple-effect distillation (MED) works through a series of steps called "effects". Incoming water is sprayed onto pipes which are then heated to generate steam. The steam is then used to heat the next batch of incoming sea water.  To increase efficiency, the steam used to heat the sea water can be taken from nearby power plants. Although this method is the most thermodynamically efficient among methods powered by heat, a few limitations exist such as a max temperature and max number of effects.

Vapor-compression distillation
Vapor-compression evaporation involves using either a mechanical compressor or a jet stream to compress the vapor present above the liquid.  The compressed vapor is then used to provide the heat needed for the evaporation of the rest of the sea water. Since this system only requires power, it is more cost effective if kept at a small scale.

Wave-powered desalination 
Wave powered desalination systems generally convert mechanical wave motion directly to hydraulic power for reverse osmosis. Such systems aim to maximize efficiency and reduce costs by avoiding conversion to electricity, minimizing excess pressurization above the osmotic pressure, and  innovating on hydraulic and wave power components. 
One such example is CETO, a wave power technology that desalinates seawater using submerged buoys. Wave-powered desalination plants began operating on Garden Island in Western Australia in 2013 and in Perth in 2015.

Membrane distillation 
Membrane distillation uses a temperature difference across a membrane to evaporate vapor from a brine solution and condense pure water on the colder side. The design of the membrane can have a significant effect on efficiency and durability. A study found that a membrane created via co-axial electrospinning of PVDF-HFP and silica aerogel was able to filter 99.99% of salt after continuous 30 day usage.

Osmosis

Reverse osmosis

The leading process for desalination in terms of installed capacity and yearly growth is reverse osmosis (RO). The RO membrane processes use semipermeable membranes and applied  pressure (on the membrane feed side) to preferentially induce water permeation through the membrane while rejecting salts. Reverse osmosis plant membrane systems typically use less energy than thermal desalination processes. Energy cost in desalination processes varies considerably depending on water salinity, plant size and process type. At present the cost of seawater desalination, for example, is higher than traditional water sources, but it is expected that costs will continue to decrease with technology improvements that include, but are not limited to, improved efficiency, reduction in plant footprint, improvements to plant operation and optimization, more effective feed pretreatment, and lower cost energy sources.

Reverse osmosis uses a thin-film composite membrane, which comprises an ultra-thin, aromatic polyamide thin-film. This polyamide film gives the membrane its transport properties, whereas the remainder of the thin-film composite membrane provides mechanical support. The polyamide film is a dense, void-free polymer with a high surface area, allowing for its high water permeability. A recent study has found that the water permeability is primarily governed by the internal nanoscale mass distribution of the polyamide active layer.

The reverse osmosis process requires maintenance. Various factors interfere with efficiency: ionic contamination (calcium, magnesium etc.); dissolved organic carbon (DOC); bacteria; viruses; colloids and insoluble particulates; biofouling and scaling. In extreme cases, the RO membranes are destroyed. To mitigate damage, various pretreatment stages are introduced.  Anti-scaling inhibitors include acids and other agents such as the organic polymers polyacrylamide and polymaleic acid, phosphonates and polyphosphates. Inhibitors for fouling are biocides (as oxidants against bacteria and viruses), such as chlorine, ozone, sodium or calcium hypochlorite. At regular intervals, depending on the membrane contamination; fluctuating seawater conditions; or when prompted by monitoring processes, the membranes need to be cleaned, known as emergency or shock-flushing. Flushing is done with inhibitors in a fresh water solution and the system must go offline. This procedure is environmentally risky, since contaminated water is diverted into the ocean without treatment. Sensitive marine habitats can be irreversibly damaged.

Off-grid solar-powered desalination units use solar energy to fill a buffer tank on a hill with seawater.  The reverse osmosis process receives its pressurized seawater feed in non-sunlight hours by gravity, resulting in sustainable drinking water production without the need for fossil fuels, an electricity grid or batteries. Nano-tubes are also used for the same function (i.e., Reverse Osmosis).

Forward osmosis 
Forward osmosis uses a semi-permeable membrane to effect separation of water from dissolved solutes. The driving force for this separation is an osmotic pressure gradient, such as a "draw" solution of high concentration.

Freeze–thaw 
Freeze–thaw desalination (or freezing desalination) uses freezing to remove fresh water from salt water. Salt water is sprayed during freezing conditions into a pad where an ice-pile builds up. When seasonal conditions warm, naturally desalinated melt water is recovered. This technique relies on extended periods of natural sub-freezing conditions.

A different freeze–thaw method, not weather dependent and invented by Alexander Zarchin, freezes seawater in a vacuum. Under vacuum conditions the ice, desalinated, is melted and diverted for collection and the salt is collected.

Electrodialysis membrane
Electrodialysis utilizes electric potential to move the salts through pairs of charged membranes, which trap salt in alternating channels. Several variances of electrodialysis exist such as conventional electrodialysis, electrodialysis reversal.

Microbial desalination 

Microbial desalination cells are biological electrochemical systems that implements the use of electro-active bacteria to power desalination of water in situ, resourcing the natural anode and cathode gradient of the electro-active bacteria and thus creating an internal supercapacitor.

Design aspects

Energy consumption
The energy consumption of the desalination process depends on the salinity of the water. Brackish water desalination requires less energy than seawater desalination.

The energy intensity of seawater desalination has improved: It is now about 3 kWh/m3 (in 2018), down by a factor of 10 from 20-30 kWh/m3 in 1970. This is similar to the energy consumption of other fresh water supplies transported over large distances, but much higher than local fresh water supplies that use 0.2 kWh/m3 or less.

A minimum energy consumption for seawater desalination of around 1 kWh/m3 has been determined, excluding prefiltering and intake/outfall pumping. Under 2 kWh/m3 has been achieved with reverse osmosis membrane technology, leaving limited scope for further energy reductions as the reverse osmosis energy consumption in the 1970s was 16 kWh/m3.

Supplying all US domestic water by desalination would increase domestic energy consumption by around 10%, about the amount of energy used by domestic refrigerators. Domestic consumption is a relatively small fraction of the total water usage.

Note: "Electrical equivalent" refers to the amount of electrical energy that could be generated using a given quantity of thermal energy and appropriate turbine generator. These calculations do not include the energy required to construct or refurbish items consumed in the process.

Given the energy intensive nature of desalination, with associated economic and environmental costs, desalination is generally considered a last resort after water conservation. But this is changing as prices continue to fall.

Cogeneration
Cogeneration is generating excess heat and electricity generation from a single process. Cogeneration can provide usable heat for desalination in an integrated, or "dual-purpose", facility where a power plant provides the energy for desalination. Alternatively, the facility's energy production may be dedicated to the production of potable water (a stand-alone facility), or excess energy may be produced and incorporated into the energy grid. Cogeneration takes various forms, and theoretically any form of energy production could be used. However, the majority of current and planned cogeneration desalination plants use either fossil fuels or nuclear power as their source of energy. Most plants are located in the Middle East or North Africa, which use their petroleum resources to offset limited water resources. The advantage of dual-purpose facilities is they can be more efficient in energy consumption, thus making desalination more viable.

The current trend in dual-purpose facilities is hybrid configurations, in which the permeate from reverse osmosis desalination is mixed with distillate from thermal desalination. Basically, two or more desalination processes are combined along with power production. Such facilities have been implemented in Saudi Arabia at Jeddah and Yanbu.

A typical supercarrier in the US military is capable of using nuclear power to desalinate  of water per day.

Alternatives to desalination
Increased water conservation and efficiency remain the most cost-effective approaches in areas with a large potential to improve the efficiency of water use practices. Wastewater reclamation provides multiple benefits over desalination of saline water, although it typically uses desalination membranes. Urban runoff and storm water capture also provide benefits in treating, restoring and recharging groundwater.

A proposed alternative to desalination in the American Southwest is the commercial importation of bulk water from water-rich areas either by oil tankers converted to water carriers, or pipelines. The idea is politically unpopular in Canada, where governments imposed trade barriers to bulk water exports as a result of a North American Free Trade Agreement (NAFTA) claim.

Costs

Factors that determine the costs for desalination include capacity and type of facility, location, feed water, labor, energy, financing and concentrate disposal. Costs of desalinating sea water (infrastructure, energy, and maintenance) are generally higher than fresh water from rivers or groundwater, water recycling, and water conservation, but alternatives are not always available. Desalination costs in 2013 ranged from US$0.45 to US$1.00/m3. More than half of the cost comes directly from energy cost, and since energy prices are very volatile, actual costs can vary substantially.

The cost of untreated fresh water in the developing world can reach US$5/cubic metre.

Desalination stills control pressure, temperature and brine concentrations to optimize efficiency. Nuclear-powered desalination might be economical on a large scale.

In 2014, the Israeli facilities of Hadera, Palmahim, Ashkelon, and Sorek were desalinizing water for less than US$0.40 per cubic meter. As of 2006, Singapore was desalinating water for US$0.49 per cubic meter.

Environmental concerns

Intake
In the United States, cooling water intake structures are regulated by the Environmental Protection Agency (EPA). These structures can have the same impacts on the environment as desalination facility intakes. According to EPA, water intake structures cause adverse environmental impact by sucking fish and shellfish or their eggs into an industrial system. There, the organisms may be killed or injured by heat, physical stress, or chemicals. Larger organisms may be killed or injured when they become trapped against screens at the front of an intake structure. Alternative intake types that mitigate these impacts include beach wells, but they require more energy and higher costs.

The Kwinana Desalination Plant opened in the Australian city of Perth, in 2007.

Outflow

Desalination processes produce large quantities of brine, possibly at above ambient temperature, and contain residues of pretreatment and cleaning chemicals, their reaction byproducts and heavy metals due to corrosion (especially in thermal-based plants). Chemical pretreatment and cleaning are a necessity in most desalination plants, which typically includes prevention of biofouling, scaling, foaming and corrosion in thermal plants, and of biofouling, suspended solids and scale deposits in membrane plants.

To limit the environmental impact of returning the brine to the ocean, it can be diluted with another stream of water entering the ocean, such as the outfall of a wastewater treatment or power plant. With medium to large power plant and desalination plants, the power plant's cooling water flow is likely to be several times larger than that of the desalination plant, reducing the salinity of the combination. Another method to dilute the brine is to mix it via a diffuser in a mixing zone. For example, once a pipeline containing the brine reaches the sea floor, it can split into many branches, each releasing brine gradually through small holes along its length. Mixing can be combined with power plant or wastewater plant dilution. Furthermore, zero liquid discharge systems can be adopted to treat brine before disposal.

Another possibility is making the desalination plant movable, thus avoiding that the brine builds up into a single location (as it keeps being produced by the desalination plant). Some such movable (ship-connected) desalination plants have been constructed.

Brine is denser than seawater and therefore sinks to the ocean bottom and can damage the ecosystem. Brine plumes have been seen to diminish over time to a diluted concentration, to where there was little to no effect on the surrounding environment. However studies have shown the dilution can be misleading due to the depth at which it occurred. If the dilution was observed during the summer season, there is possibility that there could have been a seasonal thermocline event that could have prevented the concentrated brine to sink to sea floor. This has the potential to not disrupt the sea floor ecosystem and instead the waters above it. Brine dispersal from the desalination plants has been seen to travel several kilometers away, meaning that it has the potential to cause harm to ecosystems far away from the plants. Careful reintroduction with appropriate measures and environmental studies can minimize this problem.

Other issues
Due to the nature of the process, there is a need to place the plants on approximately 25 acres of land on or near the shoreline. In the case of a plant built inland, pipes have to be laid into the ground to allow for easy intake and outtake. However, once the pipes are laid into the ground, they have a possibility of leaking into and contaminating nearby aquifers. Aside from environmental risks, the noise generated by certain types of desalination plants can be loud.

Health aspects

Iodine deficiency 
Desalination removes iodine from water and could increase the risk of iodine deficiency disorders. Israeli researchers claimed a possible link between seawater desalination and iodine deficiency, finding iodine deficits among adults exposed to iodine-poor water concurrently with an increasing proportion of their area's drinking water from seawater reverse osmosis (SWRO). They later found probable iodine deficiency disorders in a population reliant on desalinated seawater.
A possible link of heavy desalinated water use and national iodine deficiency was suggested by Israeli researchers. They found a high burden of iodine deficiency in the general population of Israel: 62% of school-age children and 85% of pregnant women fall below the WHO's adequacy range. They also pointed out the national reliance on iodine-depleted desalinated water, the absence of a universal salt iodization program and reports of increased use of thyroid medication in Israel as a possible reasons that the population's iodine intake is low. In the year that the survey was conducted, the amount of water produced from the desalination plants constitutes about 50% of the quantity of fresh water supplied for all needs and about 80% of the water supplied for domestic and industrial needs in Israel.

Experimental techniques
Other desalination techniques include:

Waste heat
Thermally-driven desalination technologies are frequently suggested for use with low-temperature waste heat sources, as the low temperatures are not useful for process heat needed in many industrial processes, but ideal for the lower temperatures needed for desalination. In fact, such pairing with waste heat can even improve electrical process:
Diesel generators commonly provide electricity in remote areas. About 40–50% of the energy output is low-grade heat that leaves the engine via the exhaust. Connecting a thermal desalination technology such as membrane distillation system to the diesel engine exhaust repurposes this low-grade heat for desalination. The system actively cools the diesel generator, improving its efficiency and increasing its electricity output. This results in an energy-neutral desalination solution. An example plant was commissioned by Dutch company Aquaver in March 2014 for Gulhi, Maldives.

Low-temperature thermal
Originally stemming from ocean thermal energy conversion research, low-temperature thermal desalination (LTTD) takes advantage of water boiling at low pressure, even at ambient temperature. This water is pumped through coils to condense the water vapor. The resulting condensate is purified water. LTTD may take advantage of the temperature gradient available at power plants, where large quantities of warm wastewater are discharged from the plant, reducing the energy input needed to create a temperature gradient.

Experiments were conducted in the US and Japan to test the approach. In Japan, a spray-flash evaporation system was tested by Saga University. LTTD was studied by India's National Institute of Ocean Technology (NIOT) in 2004. Their first LTTD plant opened in 2005 at Kavaratti in the Lakshadweep islands. The plant's capacity is /day, at a capital cost of INR 50 million (€922,000). In 2007, NIOT opened an experimental, floating LTTD plant off the coast of Chennai, with a capacity of /day. A smaller plant was established in 2009 at the North Chennai Thermal Power Station to prove the LTTD application where power plant cooling water is available.

Thermoionic process
In October 2009, Saltworks Technologies announced a process that uses solar or other thermal heat to drive an ionic current that removes all sodium and chlorine ions from the water using ion-exchange membranes.

Evaporation and condensation for crops
The Seawater greenhouse uses natural evaporation and condensation processes inside a greenhouse powered by solar energy to grow crops in arid coastal land.

Ion concentration polarisation (ICP) 
In 2022, using a technique that utilised multiple stages of ion concentration polarisation followed by a single stage of electrodialysis, researchers from MIT manage to create a filterless portable desalination unit, capable of removing both dissolved salts and suspended solids. Designed for use by non-experts in remote areas or natural disasters, as well as on military operations, the prototype is the size of a suitcase, measuring 42 × 33.5 × 19 cm3 and weighing 9.25 kg. The process is fully automated, notifying the user when the water is safe to drink, and can be controlled by a single button or smartphone app. As it does not require a high pressure pump the process is highly energy efficient, consuming only 20 watt-hours per liter of drinking water produced, making it capable of being powered by common portable solar panels. Using a filterless design at low pressures or replaceable filters significantly reduces maintenance requirements, while the device itself is self cleaning. However, the device is limited to producing 0.33 liters of drinking water per minute. There are also concerns that fouling will impact the long-term reliability, especially in water with high turbidity. The researchers are working to increase the efficiency and production rate with the intent to commercialise the product in the future, however a significant limitation is the reliance on expensive materials in the current design.

Other approaches

Adsorption-based desalination (AD) relies on the moisture absorption properties of certain materials such as Silica Gel.

Forward osmosis 
One process was commercialized by Modern Water PLC using forward osmosis, with a number of plants reported to be in operation.

Hydrogel based desalination 

The idea of the method is in the fact that when the hydrogel is put into contact with aqueous salt solution, it swells absorbing a solution with the ion composition different from the original one. This solution can be easily squeezed out from the gel by means of sieve or microfiltration membrane. The compression of the gel in closed system lead to change in salt concentration, whereas the compression in open system, while the gel is exchanging ions with bulk, lead to the change in the number of ions. The consequence of the compression and swelling in open and closed system conditions mimics the reverse Carnot Cycle of refrigerator machine. The only difference is that instead of heat this cycle transfers salt ions from the bulk of low salinity to a bulk of high salinity. Similarly to the Carnot cycle this cycle is fully reversible, so can in principle work with an ideal thermodynamic efficiency. Because the method is free from the use of osmotic membranes it can compete with reverse osmosis method. In addition, unlike the reverse osmosis, the approach is not sensitive to the quality of feed water and its seasonal changes, and allows the production of water of any desired concentration.

Small-scale solar 
The United States, France and the United Arab Emirates are working to develop practical solar desalination. AquaDania's WaterStillar has been installed at Dahab, Egypt, and in Playa del Carmen, Mexico. In this approach, a solar thermal collector measuring two square metres can distill from 40 to 60 litres per day from any local water source – five times more than conventional stills. It eliminates the need for plastic PET bottles or energy-consuming water transport. In Central California, a startup company WaterFX is developing a solar-powered method of desalination that can enable the use of local water, including runoff water that can be treated and used again. Salty groundwater in the region would be treated to become freshwater, and in areas near the ocean, seawater could be treated.

Passarell 
The Passarell process uses reduced atmospheric pressure rather than heat to drive evaporative desalination. The pure water vapor generated by distillation is then compressed and condensed using an advanced compressor. The compression process improves distillation efficiency by creating the reduced pressure in the evaporation chamber. The compressor centrifuges the pure water vapor after it is drawn through a demister (removing residual impurities) causing it to compress against tubes in the collection chamber. The compression of the vapor increases its temperature. The heat is transferred to the input water falling in the tubes, vaporizing the water in the tubes. Water vapor condenses on the outside of the tubes as product water. By combining several physical processes, Passarell enables most of the system's energy to be recycled through its evaporation, demisting, vapor compression, condensation, and water movement processes.

Geothermal 
Geothermal energy can drive desalination. In most locations, geothermal desalination beats using scarce groundwater or surface water, environmentally and economically.

Nanotechnology 
Nanotube membranes of higher permeability than current generation of membranes may lead to eventual reduction in the footprint of RO desalination plants. It has also been suggested that the use of such membranes will lead to reduction in the energy needed for desalination.

Hermetic, sulphonated nano-composite membranes have shown to be capable of removing various contaminants to the parts per billion level, and have little or no susceptibility to high salt concentration levels.

Biomimesis 
Biomimetic membranes are another approach.

Electrochemical 
In 2008, Siemens Water Technologies announced technology that applied electric fields to desalinate one cubic meter of water while using only a purported 1.5 kWh of energy. If accurate, this process would consume one-half the energy of other processes. As of 2012 a demonstration plant was operating in Singapore. Researchers at the University of Texas at Austin and the University of Marburg are developing more efficient methods of electrochemically mediated seawater desalination.

Electrokinetic shocks 
A process employing electrokinetic shock waves can be used to accomplish membraneless desalination at ambient temperature and pressure. In this process, anions and cations in salt water are exchanged for carbonate anions and calcium cations, respectively using electrokinetic shockwaves. Calcium and carbonate ions react to form calcium carbonate, which precipitates, leaving fresh water. The theoretical energy efficiency of this method is on par with electrodialysis and reverse osmosis.

Temperature swing solvent extraction 

Solvent extraction is a common technique in chemical engineering. In a study, TSSE removed up to 98.4 percent of the salt in brine. A solvent whose solubility varies with temperature is added to saltwater. At room temperature the solvent draws water molecules away from the salt. The water-laden solvent is then heated, causing the solvent to release the now salt-free water.

It can desalinate extremely salty brine up to seven times as salty as the ocean. For comparison, the current methods can only handle brine twice as salty.

Wave energy 
A small-scale offshore system uses wave energy to desalinate 30–50 m3/day. The system operates with no external power, and is constructed of recycled plastic bottles.

Plants 
Trade Arabia claims Saudi Arabia to be producing 7.9 million cubic meters of desalinated water daily, or  22% of world total as of 2021 yearend.

 Perth began operating a reverse osmosis seawater desalination plant in 2006. The Perth desalination plant is powered partially by renewable energy from the Emu Downs Wind Farm. 
 A desalination plant now operates in Sydney, and the Wonthaggi desalination plant was under construction in Wonthaggi, Victoria. A wind farm at Bungendore in New South Wales was purpose-built to generate enough renewable energy to offset the Sydney plant's energy use, mitigating concerns about harmful greenhouse gas emissions.
 A January 17, 2008, article in The Wall Street Journal stated, "In November, Connecticut-based Poseidon Resources Corp. won a key regulatory approval to build the $300 million water-desalination plant in Carlsbad, north of San Diego. The facility would produce 190,000 cubic metres of drinking water per day, enough to supply about 100,000 homes. As of June 2012, the cost for the desalinated water had risen to $2,329 per acre-foot. Each $1,000 per acre-foot works out to $3.06 for 1,000 gallons, or $0.81 per cubic meter.
As new technological innovations continue to reduce the capital cost of desalination, more countries are building desalination plants as a small element in addressing their water scarcity problems.

 Israel desalinizes water for a cost of 53 cents per cubic meter 
 Singapore desalinizes water for 49 cents per cubic meter  and also treats sewage with reverse osmosis for industrial and potable use (NEWater).
 China and India, the world's two most populous countries, are turning to desalination to provide a small part of their water needs 
 In 2007 Pakistan announced plans to use desalination 
 All Australian capital cities (except Canberra, Darwin, Northern Territory and Hobart) are either in the process of building desalination plants, or are already using them. In late 2011, Melbourne will begin using Australia's largest desalination plant, the Wonthaggi desalination plant to raise low reservoir levels.
 In 2007 Bermuda signed a contract to purchase a desalination plant 
 Before 2015, the largest desalination plant in the United States was at Tampa Bay, Florida, which began desalinizing 25 million gallons (95000 m³) of water per day in December 2007. In the United States, the cost of desalination is $3.06 for 1,000 gallons, or 81 cents per cubic meter. In the United States, California, Arizona, Texas, and Florida use desalination for a very small part of their water supply. Since 2015, the Claude "Bud" Lewis Carlsbad Desalination Plant has been producing 50 million gallons of drinking water daily.

As of 2008, "World-wide, 13,080 desalination plants produce more than 12 billion gallons of water a day, according to the International Desalination Association." An estimate in 2009 found that the worldwide desalinated water supply will triple between 2008 and 2020.

One of the world's largest desalination hubs is the Jebel Ali Power Generation and Water Production Complex in the United Arab Emirates. It is a site featuring multiple plants using different desalination technologies and is capable of producing 2.2 million cubic meters of water per day.

A typical aircraft carrier in the U.S. military uses nuclear power to desalinize  of water per day.

In nature

Evaporation of water over the oceans in the water cycle is a natural desalination process.

The formation of sea ice produces ice with little salt, much lower than in seawater.

Seabirds distill seawater using countercurrent exchange in a gland with a rete mirabile. The gland secretes highly concentrated brine stored near the nostrils above the beak. The bird then "sneezes" the brine out. As freshwater is not usually available in their environments, some seabirds, such as pelicans, petrels, albatrosses, gulls and terns, possess this gland, which allows them to drink the salty water from their environments while they are far from land.

Mangrove trees grow in seawater; they secrete salt by trapping it in parts of the root, which are then eaten by animals (usually crabs). Additional salt is removed by storing it in leaves that fall off. Some types of mangroves have glands on their leaves, which work in a similar way to the seabird desalination gland. Salt is extracted to the leaf exterior as small crystals, which then fall off the leaf.

Willow trees and reeds absorb salt and other contaminants, effectively desalinating the water. This is used in artificial constructed wetlands, for treating sewage.

History
Desalination has been known to history for millennia as both a concept, and later practice, though in a limited form. The ancient Greek philosopher Aristotle observed in his work Meteorology that "salt water, when it turns into vapour, becomes sweet and the vapour does not form salt water again when it condenses," and also noticed that a fine wax vessel would hold potable water after being submerged long enough in seawater, having acted as a membrane to filter the salt. There are numerous other examples of experimentation in desalination throughout Antiquity and the Middle Ages, but desalination was never feasible on a large scale until the modern era. A good example of this experimentation are the observations by Leonardo da Vinci (Florence, 1452), who realized that distilled water could be made cheaply in large quantities by adapting a still to a cookstove. During the Middle Ages elsewhere in Central Europe, work continued on refinements in distillation, although not necessarily directed towards desalination.

However, it is possible that the first major land-based desalination plant may have been installed under emergency conditions on an island off the coast of Tunisia in 1560. It is believed that a garrison of 700 Spanish soldiers was besieged by a large number of Turks and that, during the siege, the captain in charge fabricated a still capable of producing 40 barrels of fresh water per day, though details of the device have not been reported.

Before the Industrial Revolution, desalination was primarily of concern to oceangoing ships, which otherwise needed to keep on board supplies of fresh water. Sir Richard Hawkins (1562-1622), who made extensive travels in the South Seas, reported in his return that he had been able to supply his men with fresh water by means of shipboard distillation. Additionally, during the early 1600s, several prominent figures of the era such as Francis Bacon or Walter Raleigh published reports on water desalination. These reports and others, set the climate for the first patent dispute concerning desalination apparatus. The two first patents regarding water desalination date back to 1675 and 1683 (patents No.184 and No. 226, published by Mr. William Walcot and Mr. Robert Fitzgerald (and others), respectively). Nevertheless, neither of the two inventions was really put into service as a consequence of technical problems derived from scale-up difficulties. No significant improvements to the basic seawater distillation process were made for some time during the 150 years from the mid-1600s until 1800.

When the frigate Protector was sold to Denmark in the 1780s (as the ship Hussaren) the desalination plant was studied and recorded in great detail. In the newly formed United States, Thomas Jefferson catalogued heat-based methods going back to the 1500s, and formulated practical advice that was publicized to all U.S. ships on the backs of sailing clearance permits.

Beginning about 1800, things started changing very rapidly as consequence of the appearance of the steam engine and the so-called age of steam. The development of a knowledge of the thermodynamics of steam processes  and the need for a pure water source for its use in boilers, generated a positive effect regarding distilling systems. Additionally, the spread of European colonialism induced a need for freshwater in remote parts of the world, thus creating the appropriate climate for water desalination.

In parallel with the development and improvement of systems using steam (multiple-effect evaporators), this type of devices quickly demonstrated their potential in the field of desalination. In 1852, Alphonse René le Mire de Normandy, was issued a British patent for a vertical tube seawater distilling unit which thanks to its simplicity of design and ease of construction, very quickly gained popularity for shipboard use. Land-based desalting units did not significantly appear until the later half of the nineteenth century. In the 1860s, the US Army purchased three Normandy evaporators, each rated at 7000 gallons/day and installed them on the islands of Key West and Dry Tortugas. Another important land-based desalter plant was installed at Suakin during the 1880s which was able to provide freshwater to the British troops placed there. It consisted of six-effect distillers with a capacity of 350 tons/day.

Significant research into improved desalination methods occurred in the United States after World War II. The Office of Saline Water was created in the United States Department of the Interior in 1955 in accordance with the Saline Water Conversion Act of 1952.  It was merged into the Office of Water Resources Research in 1974.

The first industrial desalination plant in the United States opened in Freeport, Texas in 1961 with the hope of bringing water security to the region after a decade of drought. Vice-president Lyndon B. Johnson attended the plant's opening on June 21, 1961.  President John F. Kennedy recorded a speech from the White House, describing desalination as "a work that in many ways is more important than any other scientific enterprise in which this country is now engaged."

Research took place at state universities in California, at the Dow Chemical Company and DuPont.
Many studies focus on ways to optimize desalination systems.

The first commercial reverse osmosis desalination plant, Coalinga desalination plant, was inaugurated in California in 1965 for brackish water. A few years later, in 1975, the first sea water reverse osmosis desalination plant came into operation.

Society and culture
Despite the issues associated with desalination processes, public support for its development can be very high. One survey of a Southern California community saw 71.9% of all respondents being in support of desalination plant development in their community. In many cases, high freshwater scarcity corresponds to higher public support for desalination development whereas areas with low water scarcity tend to have less public support for its development.

See also

 Atmospheric water generator
 Dewvaporation
 Flexible barge
 Peak water
 Pumpable ice technology
 Soil desalination model
 Soil salinity
 Soil salinity and groundwater model

References

External links

 International Desalination Association
 European Desalination Society
 Working principles in desalination systems
 Classification of Desalination Technologies (CDT)
 SOLAR TOWER Project – Clean Electricity Generation for Desalination.
 Desalination bibliography Library of Congress
 Encyclopedia of Desalination and water and Water Resources

Environmental issues with water
Filters
Fresh water
Water supply
Water desalination
Water treatment